Achraf El Bouchataoui (born 12 January 2000) is a Dutch professional footballer who plays as a midfielder for Belgian club KMSK Deinze.

Club career
On 2 May 2019, El Bouchataoui signed his first professional contract with Feyenoord. On 15 January 2020, he signed on loan with Dordrecht for the remainder of the 2019–20 season. El Bouchataoui made his professional debut with Dordrecht in a 2–0 Eerste Divisie loss to Jong Ajax on 20 January 2020.

On 28 June 2022, El Bouchataoui signed a two-year deal with Deinze in Belgium.

International career
Born in the Netherlands, El Bouchataoui is of Moroccan descent. He was a youth international for the Netherlands.

References

External links
 
 Ons Oranje U17 Profile
 Ons Oranje U18 Profile

2000 births
Living people
Footballers from Rotterdam
Dutch footballers
Netherlands youth international footballers
Dutch sportspeople of Moroccan descent
Feyenoord players
FC Dordrecht players
RKC Waalwijk players
K.M.S.K. Deinze players
Eerste Divisie players
Eredivisie players
Association football midfielders
Dutch expatriate footballers
Expatriate footballers in Belgium
Dutch expatriate sportspeople in Belgium